Echanella is a genus of moths of the family Noctuidae.

Species
Echanella albibasalis (Holland, 1900) (syn: Echanella purpurea Bethune-Baker, 1908, Echanella rugosa (Holland, 1900))
Echanella funerea (Bethune-Baker, 1908)
Echanella hirsutipennis Robinson, 1975
Echanella obliquistriga A.E. Prout, 1928
Echanella temperata A.E. Prout, 1928

References
Natural History Museum Lepidoptera genus database

Herminiinae